Inauguration of James Monroe may refer to: 

First inauguration of James Monroe, 1817
Second inauguration of James Monroe, 1821

See also